Herophila fairmairei is a species of beetle in the family Cerambycidae. It was described by James Thomson in 1857 and is found in Greece. Herophila faurmairei live 2-3 years and are 12-25 mm in length.

References

Phrissomini
Beetles described in 1857